State Route 233 (SR 233) is a  state highway in rural eastern Elko County, Nevada, United States. The highway follows the route of the First transcontinental railroad from Interstate 80 (I-80) to the Utah state line. The highway was formerly numbered State Route 30.

Route description

I-80 follows the route of the First Transcontinental Railroad throughout most of Nevada, but departs this corridor east of Wells. The historical route went around the north end of the Pequop Mountains, towards the north shore of the Great Salt Lake. Modern I-80 directly crosses these mountains en route to the south shore of the lake. State Route 233 exits I-80 at Exit 378 in Oasis, on the other side of the Pequops from Wells. Route 233 proceeds on a northeast course to rejoin the route of the railroad. The highway passes through the community of Monetello en route to the Utah state line, where the highway continues as Utah State Route 30. In Utah, the route also loosely follows the historical routes of the railroad around the north side of the Great Salt Lake until connecting with Interstate 84.

History
This corridor parallels the route of the First Transcontinental Railroad.

The highway was originally State Route 30. The highway first appeared on the official Nevada state highway map in 1933. The connecting highway in Utah was originally numbered State Route 70, but was renumbered Route 30 in 1966. With this change the highway carried the number 30 on both sides of the state line. The highway was re-numbered State Route 233 as part of a mass renumbering of Nevada state routes. The 1978 edition of the official Nevada Department of Transportation state highway map was the first to show both numbers, with the 1982 edition the first to use only the 233 designation.

Major intersections

See also

 List of state highways in Nevada

References

External links

233
Transportation in Elko County, Nevada